Niccolò Piccolomini (died 1467) was a Roman Catholic prelate who served as Archbishop of Benevento (1464–1467).

Biography
On 3 August 1464, Niccolò Piccolomini was appointed during the papacy of Pope Pius II as Archbishop of Benevento.
He served as Archbishop of Benevento until his death on 21 Oct 1467.

References

External links and additional sources
 (for Chronology of Bishops) 
 (for Chronology of Bishops) 

15th-century Roman Catholic archbishops in the Kingdom of Naples
Bishops appointed by Pope Pius II
1467 deaths
Niccolo